Windom is an unincorporated community in Lost River Township, Martin County, in the U.S. state of Indiana.

History
A post office was established at Windom in 1892, and remained in operation until it was discontinued in 1906. The community was named after William Windom, 39th United States Secretary of the Treasury.

Geography

References

Unincorporated communities in Martin County, Indiana
Unincorporated communities in Indiana